GateKeeper is a wireless proximity-based access control and authentication device that allows a user to automatically lock their computer by walking away and unlock it by walking back. The GateKeeper consists of a key fob (the device), a USB dongle to transmit the wireless signal, and software to manage user credentials. The device also functions as a password manager.

GateKeeper Software and Hardware 
GateKeeper software uses a dashboard that displays the device's signal strength, allows users to select or configure lock settings, manage user credentials, and set the range at which the computer detects the device's presence. The GateKeeper software provides the user options to enable two-factor authentication (2FA) for computer access by requiring the user to enter a PIN and carry the GateKeeper security token to login.
If the USB sensor is ever removed from the computer, the software immediately locks the computer.

GateKeeper Enterprise 
The GateKeeper Enterprise software integrates with the GateKeeper hardware, which allows the administrator to control the deployment and management of GateKeepers on the network. The IT administrator can set security policies, gather log data for auditing, conduct productivity analysis, and deploy updates to the client software.

See also 
 Computer access control
 Security information and event management 
 RFID
 Wireless lock
 Log management
 Computer security
 Bluetooth token

References

External links 

Computer security software
Computer access control
Access control
Access control software
Identity management systems
Identity management
Key management
Authentication methods
Password authentication
Locks (security device)
Radio-frequency identification
Wireless locating
Security technology
Data security
Bluetooth
Smart cards